Michael ("Mike") James Powell (born ) is a Welsh rugby union player. Powell played for Caldicot, Pontypool, the Exeter Chiefs, Bridgend RFC, the Celtic Warriors and the Ospreys before joining London Welsh. He signed for Moseley for the 2012–13 season.

Powell captained Wales Students while at university.

Mike Powell's position of choice is at lock.

References

External links
Ospreys profile

1978 births
Living people
London Welsh RFC players
Moseley Rugby Football Club players
Ospreys (rugby union) players
Welsh rugby union players
Exeter Chiefs players